Midland Township may refer to:

 Midland Township, Lyon County, Iowa
 Midland Township, Michigan
 Midland Township, St. Louis County, Missouri, in St. Louis County, Missouri
 Midland Township, Gage County, Nebraska
 Midland Township, Merrick County, Nebraska
 Midland Township, Bergen County, New Jersey
 Midland Township, Pembina County, North Dakota, in Pembina County, North Dakota
 Midland Township, Hand County, South Dakota, in Hand County, South Dakota

Township name disambiguation pages